Dover Area High School is a midsized, suburban public high school located at 4500 Intermediate Avenue in Dover, Pennsylvania. In 2014, enrollment was reported as 1,009 pupils in 9th through 12th grades.

Alternatively, Dover Area High School students may choose to attend York County School of Technology for training in the construction and mechanical trades. The Lincoln Intermediate Unit IU12 provides the school with a wide variety of services like specialized education for disabled students and hearing, speech and visual disability services and professional development for staff and faculty.

Extracurriculars
The Dover Area School District's students have access to a wide variety of clubs, activities and an extensive sports program. The district is part of the York-Adams League for sports.

Sports
The Dover Area School District funds:

Boys
Baseball - AAA
Basketball- AAA
Cross Country - AA
Football - AAA
Golf - AAA
Soccer - AA
Swimming and Diving - AAA
Tennis - AAA
Track and Field - AAA
Volleyball - AA
Wrestling - AAA

Girls
Basketball - AAAA
Cheer - AAAA
Cross Country - AAA
Field Hockey - AAA
Golf - AAA
Soccer (Fall) - AAA
Softball - AAA
Swimming and Diving - AA
Girls' Tennis - AAA
Track and Field - AAA
Volleyball - AAA
E-Sports

Intermediate School Sports

Boys
Basketball
Cross Country 
Football
Soccer
Wrestling	

Girls
Basketball
Cross Country 
Field Hockey
Soccer (Fall)
volleyball

According to PIAA directory July 2012  According to PIAA directory July 2013

Notable alumni 

 Ray Krone, wrongfully convicted of murder
 John Kuhn, football player
 Felito Medina, PettyPineapple LLC

See also
 Kitzmiller v. Dover Area School District - ruling against the school district which had required the presentation of "intelligent design" as an alternative to evolution as an "explanation of the origin of life."

References

Public high schools in Pennsylvania
Schools in York County, Pennsylvania